"Integral" is a song by English synth-pop duo Pet Shop Boys from their ninth studio album, Fundamental (2006). A remixed version of the song was released on 8 October 2007 as a download-only single to promote the duo's fourth remix album, Disco 4 (2007). The single peaked at number 197 on the UK Singles Chart.

The artwork for the single is a QR code, which, when scanned, gives a link to the Pet Shop Boys' website.

Composition
The single criticises the Identity Cards Act 2006. A statement from the band cited the issue as the reason that Tennant ceased his well-publicized support of Tony Blair's Labour party. The lyrics are fully masked and converted to the homage to Yevgeny Zamyatin's dystopian novel We, in which the inhabitants of the future One State try to build The Integral, a glass spaceship, in order to solve the cosmic equation and resolve all the problems in their One State.

Track listing
Digital single
"Integral" (PSB Perfect Immaculate mix) – 7:16
"Integral" (Dave Spoon mix) – 7:10

Charts

References

2006 songs
2007 singles
Parlophone singles
Pet Shop Boys songs
Song recordings produced by Trevor Horn
Songs written by Chris Lowe
Songs written by Neil Tennant